Madison Dearborn Partners (MDP) is an American private equity firm specializing in leveraged buyouts of privately held or publicly traded companies, or divisions of larger companies; recapitalizations of family-owned or closely held companies; balance sheet restructurings; acquisition financings; and growth capital investments in mature companies. MDP operates using an industry-focused investment approach and focuses on the following sectors: basic industries, business and government software and services, financial & transaction services, health care, and TMT services. Since the founders established MDP as an independent firm in 1992, the firm has raised seven funds with aggregate capital of approximately $23 billion, and has completed investments in more than 130 companies.

History
Madison Dearborn Partners was founded in 1992 and is based in Chicago, Illinois. The founders, John A Canning Jr, Paul J. Finnegan, Samuel M. Mencoff, and Nicholas W. Alexos, had previously made private equity investments for First Chicago Bank. The north-east corner of First Chicago's then-headquarters was at the intersection of Madison and Dearborn Streets.

Madison Dearborn's chairman, John Canning, Jr., is also a minority owner of the Milwaukee Brewers baseball team and submitted an ultimately unsuccessful bid to buy the Chicago Cubs

Investments

In 1998, the firm bought Reiman Publications, based in Greendale, Wisconsin, from Roy Reiman for $640 million. In 2002, the firm sold Reiman Publications to Reader's Digest Association.

In 2007, the firm joined with Michael Eisner's Tornante investment company to buy out baseball card maker The Topps Company.

Madison Dearborn completed leveraged buyout transactions for a number of publicly traded and other significant companies in 2006 and 2007 including:

Asurion
CDW
LA Fitness
Nuveen investments; in 2014, a plan for MDP to sell Nuveen to TIAA-CREF for $6.25 billion was announced; while the Wall Street Journal cited an anonymous source close to the transaction to the effect that MDP "will have broken even on the transaction", Felix Salmon queried that assertion at Reuters; Dan Primack at Fortune then published additional information about auxiliary benefits to MDP to buttress the break-even claim.
Sorenson Communications
Univision Communications
VWR International
Yankee Candle

Bell Canada
On June 30, 2007, Bell Canada Enterprises (BCE) announced that the company entered into a definitive agreement for BCE to be acquired pursuant to a plan of arrangement by an investor group led by Teachers Private Capital, the private investment arm of the Ontario Teachers' Pension Plan, Providence Equity Partners Inc. and Madison Dearborn Partners. The all-cash transaction was valued at C$51.7billion (US$48.5 billion), including C$16.9 billion (US$15.9 billion) of debt, preferred equity and minority interests. The arrangement was approved on September 21, 2007, at a special meeting of shareholders by more than 97% of the votes cast by holders of common and preferred shares, voting as a single class.

Investment funds
MDP invests through a series of private limited partnerships and its investors include a variety of pension funds, endowments and other institutional investors:

Sources:

Selected portfolio

References

External links
 

 
Financial services companies established in 1992
Investment banking private equity groups
Private equity firms of the United States
Companies based in Chicago